John Michael Davoren (30 August 1866 – 3 February 1941) was an Australian politician.

He was born in Goulburn to farmer Michael Davoren and Mary Welsh. He worked as a miner at Wallsend and then a ganger at Homebush, eventually farming near Wauchope. He married Mary Gertrude McGoldrick, with whom he had five children. A foundation member of the Labor Party, he served as a member of the New South Wales Legislative Council from 1931 to 1934. Davoren died in 1941 at Lidcombe.

References

1866 births
1941 deaths
Australian Labor Party members of the Parliament of New South Wales
Members of the New South Wales Legislative Council